Duncan Leitch may refer to:
 Duncan Leitch (neurobiologist)
 Duncan Leitch (geologist)
 Duncan Leitch (minister)